The PlayStation VR (PS VR, known by its code name Project Morpheus during development) is a virtual reality headset developed by Sony Interactive Entertainment, which was released in October 2016.

It is fully functional with the PlayStation 4 and is backwards compatible with the PlayStation 5 home video game console. The PlayStation VR is compatible with the PlayStation 5 via backward compatibility using a USB to PlayStation Camera adapter that is shipped for free by Sony to anyone who has previously purchased the PS VR. There are currently no PlayStation 5 games announced that support it; if a PS VR supported game also has a PlayStation 5 version available, the PlayStation 4 version has to be installed instead via backward compatibility to be able to play in virtual reality. In certain games and demos for the VR, the player wearing the headset acts separately from other players without the headset. The PlayStation VR system can output a picture to both the PlayStation VR headset and a television simultaneously, with the television either mirroring the picture displayed on the headset, or displaying a separate image for competitive or cooperative gameplay. PlayStation VR works with either the standard DualShock 4 controller, PlayStation Move controllers or the PlayStation VR Aim controller.

The PlayStation VR has a 5.7 inch OLED panel, with a display resolution of 1080p. The headset also has a processor box which enables the Social Screen video output to the television, as well as process the 3D audio effect, and uses a 3.5mm headphone jack. The headset also has nine positional LEDs on its surface for the PlayStation Camera to track 360 degree head movement.

As of December 31, 2019, PlayStation VR had sold-through 5 million units worldwide.

Sony announced the PlayStation VR2 for the PlayStation 5 at the 2022 Consumer Electronics Show.

History
Sony's interest in head-mounted display technology dates back to the 1990s. Its first commercial unit, the Glasstron, was released in 1997. One application of this technology was in the game MechWarrior 2, which permitted users of the Glasstron or Virtual I/O's  to adopt a visual perspective from inside the cockpit of the craft, using their own eyes as visual and seeing the battlefield through their craft's own cockpit.

In early 2014, Sony Interactive Entertainment research and development engineer Anton Mikhailov said his team had been working on Project Morpheus for more than three years. According to Mikhailov, the PlayStation 3 Move peripheral, itself revealed in June 2009, was designed with unspecified, future head-mounted technology in mind. "We specced it and built it to be a VR controller, even though VR wasn't a commodity. As engineers, we just said it was the right thing to do. At the time, we didn't have a consumer-grade project that we could work on, but it was definitely designed with that vision in mind." Shuhei Yoshida, the president of Sony's worldwide studios, also said the project started as "grassroots" activity among engineers and programmers, which came into focus in 2010 once the Move controller had been released. Sony also went on record to say it is mandatory for all games to have no less than 60 frames per second at all times.

Project Morpheus was first announced at The 2014 Game Developers Conference. SIE Worldwide Studios president Shuhei Yoshida introduced the device on March 18, 2014, and stated Project Morpheus was "the next innovation from PlayStation that will [shape] the future of games."

On September 15, 2015, it was announced that Project Morpheus would be officially named PlayStation VR. Later in 2015, Sony acquired SoftKinetic, a tech startup whose focus includes visual depth-sensing gesture recognition, for an undisclosed amount.

On October 13, 2016, Sony released the PlayStation VR with the price of $399 in the US, €399 in Europe, £349 in the UK, and ¥44,980 in Japan.

On April 16, 2019, Mark Cerny confirmed that the PlayStation VR would be compatible with the PlayStation 5. This is in addition to new PlayStation VR hardware to be designed for the PlayStation 5 that Sony plans to release after 2021. This was announced as the PlayStation VR2 at the 2022 Consumer Electronics Show.

Hardware 

The prototype revealed at GDC'15 included an OLED 1920 × 1080 pixel display (providing 960 × 1080 pixels resolution per eye) with an RGB subpixel matrix, and is capable of displaying content at 120fps. It features an FOV of 100°, 6DOF head-tracking, stereoscopic 3D, and unwarped output to a TV, either for others to view what the headset wearer sees, or a separate display to compete against the headset user using a standard PS4 controller.

In September 2015, it was revealed the headset would have three rendering modes for developers to choose from: native 90 Hz, native 120 Hz, and a mode where gameplay running at 60 Hz would be displayed at 120 Hz using a motion interpolation technique called asynchronous reprojection. The interpolation would be achieved with little system resources and a small latency of under 18 milliseconds. The technique would also be utilised in the native 120 Hz mode to ensure consistent framerate. According to a Sony representative, the company expects the interpolated 120 Hz mode to be a popular choice for games.

PlayStation VR games can send different perspectives to the headset and television. Shuhei Yoshida, president of SIE Worldwide Studios, explained in regards to a demo by Japan Studio, Monster Escape (in which four players playing off the TV must evade a monster controlled by a player using the headset), that this ability allowed VR to become an asymmetric "social experience", similarly citing the existing game Keep Talking and Nobody Explodes as another example of a VR-compatible game that emphasizes interaction.

On November 10, 2017, Sony released the CUH-ZVR2 model of the PlayStation VR which included minor changes, like a slimmer, more streamlined connection cable with different connectors from the CUH-ZVR1 model, and integrated stereo headphones. The newer processor unit also supports HDR video pass through.

PlayStation VR Aim Controller 
The Aim Controller is an optional, abstractly-shaped light gun peripheral that was bundled with Farpoint and also sold separately for US$59.99. It is also compatible with a limited selection of VR shooter games, and mimics the feel of a gun more closely than a traditional gamepad. It has all the functions of a Dualshock controller, and, unlike the PS3-era Sharp Shooter accessory, does not require a PlayStation Move controller to be slotted in. It was praised by IGN as "a must-have for VR shooter fans on PlayStation".

Games and content

In March 2016, Sony said there were 230 developers actively working on content for PlayStation VR, with 50 titles available by the end of the year.

Existing, non-VR games can be played within PlayStation VR via "Cinematic Mode", which renders the content on a simulated projection screen in a 3D space. The mode has three screen size options, ranging up to 226 inches (18.8 ft) in virtual size. PlayStation VR also supports the display of 360-degree photos and video. Other features, such as Share Play and Live from PlayStation, are also compatible within the headset. It can also be used to watch 3D movies on Blu-Ray 3D.

Marketing

Prior to release, Sony predicted that interest in the headset would build steadily over time, through word of mouth.

PlayStation VR was first demonstrated on The Tonight Show Starring Jimmy Fallon, and as a playable concept during E3 2014. The device was also featured at Sony's PlayStation Experience Expo in Las Vegas in December 2014. Sony announced new information regarding Project Morpheus at the 2015 Game Developers Conference, in line with the official schedule posted on their website and released updated specifications.

In an interview with Nikkei Japan in March 2016, Sony indicated the possibility of enabling use of the PlayStation VR in connection with a PC. This would allow the device to work with platforms extending further than the PlayStation 4.

Reception
Reviews from most publications were positive; critics praised the PS VR's physical design, ease of use, and availability. Compared to other headsets that require high-end computers, the PlayStation VR only required a PS4. Most criticism was aimed at the system's performance, noting the PS4 offers less compute power than the high-end PCs required to run "PCVR" games, even though it offers "near to PC-quality performance".

Sales
As of February 19, 2017, PlayStation VR had sold over 915,000 units. Andrew House, the  President and Global CEO of Sony Interactive Entertainment (SIE), the company behind the PlayStation VR, stated that the sales of the VR were far beyond expectations. On June 5, 2017, the number of PlayStation VR units sold had passed 1 million. Sony announced that the PlayStation VR had sold over 2 million units and 12.2 million games on December 3, 2017. Sony announced that PlayStation VR had sold-through more than 3 million units and 21.9 million games worldwide as of August 16, 2018, with the PlayStation VR sold-through number increasing to 4.2 million as of March 3, 2019. , PlayStation VR has sold-through 5 million units.

See also
 List of PlayStation VR games

References

External links

 Official website
 PlayStation VR on VRcompare
 Jamie Feltham, Project Morpheus: The Story So Far by VR Focus

 
Computer peripherals
PlayStation 4 accessories
Products introduced in 2016
Virtual reality headsets
Video game console add-ons